Goudoumaria, Niger (var. Goudomaria, Gudumaria) is a town in the southeast of the country, in Diffa Region, northwest of Diffa. Goudoumaria is an administrative post in the Maine-Soroa Department, and is approx. 50 km north of the Nigerian border and approximately 50 km east of the small city Soubdou.

Climate
Goudoumaria, historically an area of pastoralism and marginal farming, is in the Sahel region, bordering the Sahara.  Desertification has led to a growth of Date palm farming in recent decades.

References

  Michel Jahiel. Effet des récentes perturbations climatiques sur la phéniciculture dans le sud-est du Niger. Science et changements planétaires / Sécheresse. Volume 4, Number 1, pp 7–16, March 1993. On desertification

Communes of Niger